Nikolay Vasilyevich Ivanov (born 30 May 1952, Kostroma Oblast) is a Russian political figure and a deputy of the 1st State Duma.

From 1976 to 1977, Ivanov served as a second secretary of the Dubrovsky District committee of the Komsomol. In January 1989, Ivanov was nominated as a candidate for People's Deputies of the USSR in the Volodarsky constituency, but during the election campaign, he withdrew the candidacy. On 12 December 1993 he was elected deputy of the 1st State Duma. In October 1995, Ivanov's deputy powers were terminated ahead of schedule as he got a position at the Accounts Chamber of Russia.

References
 

 

1952 births
Living people
Agrarian Party of Russia politicians
20th-century Russian politicians
People from Kostroma Oblast
First convocation members of the State Duma (Russian Federation)